Nebria grumi is a species of ground beetle in the Nebriinae subfamily that is endemic to Kyrgyzstan.

References

grumi
Beetles described in 1902
Beetles of Asia
Endemic fauna of Kyrgyzstan